Pudentiana is a traditional Christian saint and martyress of the 2nd century who refused to worship the Roman Emperors Marcus Aurelius and Antoninus Pius as deities. She is sometimes locally known as  Potentiana and is often coupled with her sister, Praxedes the martyr.

Legend 

According to her acta and the Martyrology of Reichenau, she was a Roman virgin of the early Christian church, daughter of Saint Pudens, friend of the Apostles, and sister of Praxedes. Praxedes and Pudentiana, together with presbyter Pastor and Pope Pius I, built a baptistry in the church inside their father's house, and started to baptize pagans. Pudentiana died at the age of 16, possibly a martyr, and is buried next to her father Pudens, in the Priscilla catacombs on the via Salaria.

While there is evidence for the life of Pudens, there is no direct evidence for either Pudentiana or Praxedes. It is possible that the early Church's "ecclesia Pudentiana" (i.e., the Church of Pudens) was mistaken for "Saint Pudentiana".

Veneration 
A basilica in Rome is named for her, and her commemoration in the General Roman Calendar fell on 19 May until its 1969 revision. Pudentiana is now mentioned neither there nor in the Roman Martyrology.

The Spanish Conquistador Miguel López de Legazpi, the founder of the modern City of Manila, gained possession of the territory on 19 May 1571. As it was the Feast of Pudentiana (in Spanish Potenciana), Legazpi declared her patroness of what is now the Philippines.

By the Apostolic Letter Impositi Nobis of 12 September 1942, Pope Pius XII, at the request of the Philippine episcopacy, declared the Virgin Mary under the title of the Immaculate Conception as principal patroness of the country, with Saints Pudentiana and Rose of Lima as secondary patronesses, mentioning that historical documents indicated Pudentiana as patroness from the 16th century and Rose of Lima from the 17th. Today, Intramuros (the walled Spanish citadel that was the nucleus of Manila) still has a street that bears her name.

Homonymous town in Numidia 
The name Pudentiana is also the name of an unrelated ancient town and episcopal see in the Roman province of Numidia, which is among the titular sees listed in the Annuario Pontificio. Two holders of the titular see have become cardinals: Mario Casariego y Acevedo and Oscar Andrés Rodríguez Maradiaga.

See also 
Saint Potenciana
Novatus

References

External links
 
 St. Pudentiana
Colonnade Statue in St Peter's Square

2nd-century Christian martyrs
2nd-century Romans
2nd-century Roman women
Christian child saints
Ante-Nicene Christian female saints
Italian saints
Year of birth unknown
Legendary Romans